

Denmark
South Greenland – Carl Peter Holbøll, Inspector of South Greenland (1828–1856)

Portugal
Angola – Manuel Eleutério Malheiro, Governor-General of Angola (1839–1842)

United Kingdom
 Bermuda – William Reid, Governor of Bermuda (1839–1846)
 Malta Colony – Henry Bouverie, Governor of Malta (1836–1843)
 New South Wales – Major George Gipps, Governor of New South Wales (1838–1846)
 Straits Settlement – George Bonham, Governor of the Staits Settlement (1836–1843)
 South Australia 
 Lieutenant-Colonel George Gawler, Governor of South Australia (1838–1841)
 Sir George Grey, Governor of South Australia (1841–1845)
 Western Australia – John Hutt, Governor of Western Australia (1839–1846)

Colonial governors
Colonial governors
1841